HMS Milford was a fifth rate built under the 1689 programme built at Deptford Dockyard. Her guns were listed under old terms for guns as demi-culverines, sakers and minions. After commissioning she spent her short career in Newfoundland and Home Waters. She was taken by the French in 1693.

Milford was the second name vessel since it was used for a 22-gun ship launched by Page of Wivenhoe in 1654, renamed Milford in 1660 and burnt by accident at Leghorn on 7 July 1673.

Construction
She was ordered on 28 June 1689 from Woolwich Dockyard to be built under the guidance of Master Shipwright Joseph Lawrence. She was launched on 18 March 1690.

Commissioned Service
She was commissioned on 10 March 1690 under the command of Captain Charles Hawkins, RN for service on the Newfoundland fisheries. In 1692 she came under command of Captain Rodger Vaughan for service in the North Sea,

LossHMS Milford was taken by a squadron of four French ships off Oxfordness losing 16 members of her crew killed on 1 December 1693. She served in the French Navy as Le Milford or Le Milfort'' until 1702.

Notes

Citations

References
 Winfield 2009, British Warships in the Age of Sail (1603 – 1714), by Rif Winfield, published by Seaforth Publishing, England © 2009, EPUB , Chapter 5, The Fifth Rates, Vessels acquired from 16 December 1688, Fifth Rates of 32 and 36 guns, 1689 Programme, Milford
 Colledge, Ships of the Royal Navy, by J.J. Colledge, revised and updated by Lt Cdr Ben Warlow and Steve Bush, published by Seaforth Publishing, Barnsley, Great Britain, © 2020, EPUB , Section M (Milford)

 

Frigates of the Royal Navy
Ships built in Woolwich
Ships of the Royal Navy
1690s ships